The 2014 Wandsworth Council election took place on 22 May 2014 to elect members of Wandsworth Council in England. This was on the same day as other local elections.

Results
The Conservatives retained control winning 41 seats (-6). Labour won 19 seats (+6).

Ward results

References

Wandsworth
2014